Rocky Johnson (born Wayde Douglas Bowles; August 24, 1944 – January 15, 2020) was a Canadian professional wrestler. Among many National Wrestling Alliance titles, he was the first Black Georgia Heavyweight Champion as well as the NWA Television Champion (2 times). He won the World Tag Team Championship in 1983, along with his partner Tony Atlas, to become the first black champions in WWE history. He is the father of actor and former WWE wrestler Dwayne "The Rock" Johnson.

Early life 

Johnson was born Wayde Douglas Bowles in Amherst, Nova Scotia, where he was raised, the fourth of five sons of Lillian (1919–1996) and James Henry Bowles (1888–1957). A Black Nova Scotian, he was descended from Black Loyalists who immigrated to Nova Scotia after escaping from a plantation in the United States after the American Revolutionary War, and also had part-Irish ancestry. At the age of 16, Johnson moved to Toronto, where he began wrestling and worked as a truck driver. Initially, he trained to be a boxer and eventually sparred with greats such as Muhammad Ali and George Foreman, but was always fascinated by wrestling.

Professional wrestling career

National Wrestling Alliance (1964–1982)
Johnson began his career as a professional wrestler in 1964 in Southern Ontario; soon after his debut, he legally changed his name to his moniker. He chose the name Rocky Johnson as a tribute to two of his favorite boxing greats: Rocky Marciano and Jack Johnson, the latter being the first black heavyweight boxing champion. In the late 1960s to mid 1970s, he was a major star in California. In Los Angeles he took on Freddie Blassie, The Destroyer and John Tolos.

He was a top contender in the National Wrestling Alliance in the 1970s, receiving title matches against then-World Champions Terry Funk and Harley Race. He was well-suited for tag team wrestling, winning several regional tag team championships in the NWA. Johnson wrestled off and on in the Memphis promotion, often feuding with Jerry Lawler, winning Lawler's crown at one point. He also wrestled under a mask as "Sweet Ebony Diamond" in the Mid-Atlantic area.

World Wrestling Federation (1982–1985)
In 1982, Johnson  feuded with Don Muraco, Greg Valentine, Mike Sharpe, Buddy Rose, and Adrian Adonis. He was then paired with Tony Atlas as a tag team. They defeated the Wild Samoans (Afa and Sika) for the Tag Team Championship on the December 10, 1983 episode of Championship Wrestling (taped November 15). They were the first black men to hold a WWF championship. Together, they were billed as "The Soul Patrol".

Later career (1985–1991)
After leaving WWF in June 1985, Johnson went to Central States, Tennessee, Hawaii, Portland, Puerto Rico and the independent circuit. In Hawaii, he teamed with his brother Ricky Johnson.

Retirement 

After retiring in 1991, Johnson, along with Pat Patterson, trained his son Dwayne to wrestle. While he initially resisted his son's entry into what he knew to be an extremely difficult business, Johnson agreed to train him on the condition that he would not go easy on him. Johnson was instrumental in getting Dwayne (later dubbed "Rocky Maivia" after both Rocky Johnson's and Peter Maivia's ring names) signed to a WWF developmental deal. Initially, Johnson had an on-camera presence at his son's matches, and jumped into the ring on his behalf after he was attacked by The Sultan and The Iron Sheik at WrestleMania 13. Johnson was not seen on-camera again after the Rocky Maivia character flopped, and soon Dwayne achieved crossover popularity as a cocky heel, The Rock.

In early 2003, Johnson was hired as a trainer for the WWE developmental territory, Ohio Valley Wrestling, but was let go in May. He made a return to the ring, and defeated Mabel in a boxing match at Memphis Wrestling on November 29, 2003. On February 25, 2008, Johnson was announced as an inductee into the WWE Hall of Fame along with his father-in-law, "High Chief" Peter Maivia. Both Johnson and his father-in-law were inducted into the Hall of Fame on March 29, 2008, by his son, The Rock.

On December 20, 2019, Johnson joined the board of directors of the International Pro Wrestling Hall of Fame.

Personal life
Johnson recounted in his autobiography Soulman that he met his first wife, Una Sparks, at a dance while he was training to become a boxer. Una was from Cherry Brook, Nova Scotia and a devout Jehovah's Witness. They had two children, Curtis and Wanda, whom he thanked at his 2008 WWE Hall of Fame induction. While married to Una, he became romantically involved with Ata Fitisemanu Maivia, daughter of wrestling legend "High Chief" Peter Maivia. Ata met Rocky after Maivia and Johnson were tag team partners in a match on the independent circuit. Peter Maivia disapproved of their relationship because Johnson was a wrestler. Their son Dwayne was born May 2, 1972.

Johnson stated that, in order to provide for his two families, he adopted a frugal lifestyle on the road; he subsisted on beer, sliced cheese, and bologna, and was not a "partier". He did not reveal if Una knew about Ata and Dwayne, but stated that she gave him an ultimatum to quit wrestling, or they would have to separate as Jehovah's Witnesses "didn't believe in blood sport". He stated that he and Una parted amicably and remained good friends. He obtained a divorce in Texas, then filed for a marriage license in Florida on December 21, 1978, to marry Ata. By marrying her, he became a member of the famous Samoan Anoa'i family. They divorced in 2003. During his wrestling years, Johnson was known for his extra-marital affairs. Johnson was married to Sheila Northern, a speech pathologist, at the time of his death.

In 2019, Johnson co-wrote an autobiography alongside Scott Teal, Soulman: The Rocky Johnson Story, released October 15 of that year. The book was recalled by the publisher shortly after release, due to payment disputes between Johnson and the co-author.

In 2022, Sports Illustrated published an article stating that Johnson had five other known children, in separate relationships, via genealogical DNA testing in the 2010s which connected them to Rocky's brother Ricky: Paula Parsons (b. 1964 to Thelma Parsons in Lucasville, Nova Scotia), Trevor Edwards (b. March 23, 1967 to Doreen Edwards in Montreal), Lisa Purves (b. Oct. 26, 1968 to Vera Pinter in Vancouver), Adrian Bowles (b. April 24, 1970 to Carolyn Bowles in Truro, Nova Scotia) and Aaron Fowler (b. June 17, 1970 to Jackie Fowler in Amherst, Nova Scotia). All five were refused in-person contact by Rocky in his lifetime (and have not been contacted by Rocky's three other known children), but have reunited personally with Ricky Johnson and each other.

Legal issues
In 1987, Johnson was arrested and charged for rape of a 19-year-old Tennessee woman. He claimed he was "set up" by rival wrestlers. The charges had him blacklisted from wrestling, leading him to alcoholism and a strained relationship with his son until several years later when he became sober.

In 2000, while working at the Pine Island Community Center in Davie, Florida, Johnson was investigated for several cases of misconduct, including unwanted groping of female coworkers. He later faced charges of battery and theft after he allegedly took home a piece of athletic equipment, as well as allegedly inappropriately grabbing a female coworker. The Broward State Attorney's Office, while noting there was "sufficient evidence" that Johnson had groped his coworker, declined to prosecute because the woman feared the publicity it would bring her.

Death 

On January 15, 2020, at the age of 75, Johnson died of a pulmonary embolism at the home his son bought for him in Lutz, Florida; the embolism was caused by a blood clot that traveled from a deep vein thrombosis in his leg. B. Brian Blair told the Associated Press that Johnson "thought he had the flu or something" but refused to see a doctor. Dwayne Johnson paid tribute, stating, "I'm in pain. You lived a very full, very hard, barrier breaking life and left it all in the ring. I love you dad and I'll always be your proud and grateful son." Hulk Hogan tweeted condolences, describing Rocky as "a great man, great friend" and "one of only a few that was kind and helpful when I first broke in".

In popular culture
In his first television acting job, his son Dwayne, known at the time by his ring name The Rock, portrayed his father in a season 1 (1999) episode of That '70s Show titled "That Wrestling Show".

He is portrayed by Joseph Lee Anderson in the show Young Rock, based on his son's life. The series, which was green-lit for production by NBC four days before Johnson's death, dedicated the pilot episode in Johnson's memory.

Championships and accomplishments
Big Time Wrestling
NWA World Tag Team Championship (4 time) – with Ben Justice
Championship Wrestling from Florida
NWA Brass Knuckles Championship (Florida version) (1 time)
NWA Florida Heavyweight Championship (6 times)
NWA Florida Tag Team Championship (1 time) – with Pedro Morales
NWA Florida Television Championship (1 time)
Continental Wrestling Association
AWA Southern Tag Team Championship (2 times) – with Jimmy Valiant (1) and Soul Train Jones (1)
Georgia Championship Wrestling
NWA Georgia Heavyweight Championship (2 times)
NWA Georgia Tag Team Championship (1 time) – with Jerry Brisco
NWA Macon Tag Team Championship (1 time) – with Danny Little Bear
International Championship Wrestling Alliance
ICWA Tag Team Championship (1 time) - with Crash the Terminator
Mid-Atlantic Championship Wrestling
NWA Television Championship (2 times)
NWA All-Star Wrestling
NWA Canadian Tag Team Championship (Vancouver version) (1 time) – with Don Leo Jonathan
NWA Big Time Wrestling
NWA Brass Knuckles Championship (Texas version) (1 time)
NWA Texas Heavyweight Championship (2 times)
NWA Texas Tag Team Championship (1 time) – with Jose Lothario
NWA Hollywood Wrestling
NWA Americas Heavyweight Championship (1 time)
NWA Americas Tag Team Championship (1 time) – with Earl Maynard
NWA "Beat the Champ" Television Championship (2 times)
NWA Mid-America / Continental Wrestling Association
CWA/AWA International Tag Team Championship (1 time) – with Bill Dundee
NWA Southern Heavyweight Championship (Memphis version) (1 time)
NWA San Francisco
NWA United States Heavyweight Championship (San Francisco version) (1 time)
NWA World Tag Team Championship (San Francisco version) (4 times) – with Pat Patterson (3) and Pepper Gomez (1)
NWA Polynesian Wrestling
NWA Polynesian Pacific Tag Team Championship (2 times) – with Ricky Johnson
Pacific Northwest Wrestling
NWA Pacific Northwest Heavyweight Championship (1 time)
NWA Pacific Northwest Tag Team Championship (2 times) – with Brett Sawyer (1) and Iceman Parsons (1)
Pro Wrestling Illustrated
Ranked No. 258 of the top 500 singles wrestlers in the PWI 500 in 1992
Ranked No. 211 of the 500 best singles wrestlers during the "PWI Years" in 2003
St. Louis Wrestling Hall of Fame
(Class of 2008)
World Wrestling Federation / World Wrestling Entertainment
WWF Tag Team Championship (1 time) – with Tony Atlas
WWE Hall of Fame (Class of 2008)

References

Further reading

External links

1944 births
2020 deaths
People from Amherst, Nova Scotia
Professional wrestlers from Nova Scotia
Professional wrestlers from Toronto
Anoa'i family
Black Canadian sportspeople
Black Nova Scotians
Canadian emigrants to the United States
Canadian expatriate professional wrestlers in the United States
Canadian male professional wrestlers
Canadian people of African-American descent
Canadian people of Irish descent
Deaths from pulmonary embolism
People with acquired American citizenship
Stampede Wrestling alumni
WWE Hall of Fame inductees
NWA Florida Heavyweight Champions
NWA Florida Tag Team Champions
NWA Florida Television Champions
NWA Brass Knuckles Champions (Florida version)
NWA "Beat the Champ" Television Champions
WCWA Brass Knuckles Champions
NWA Americas Tag Team Champions
NWA Americas Heavyweight Champions
NWA Georgia Heavyweight Champions
NWA Georgia Tag Team Champions
NWA/WCW World Television Champions
20th-century professional wrestlers
21st-century Canadian people